NGC 6309, also known as the Box Nebula, is a planetary nebula located in the constellation Ophiuchus. It was discovered by the German astronomer Wilhelm Tempel in 1876. It has a luminosity of about 1800 times that of the Sun. The distance to this nebula is not well known, but it is assumed to be about 6,500 light-years or 2,000 parsecs.

NGC 6309 is a quadrupolar nebula, with two pairs of lobes. Surrounding the pair is a spherical shell. The spherical shell formed before the four lobes. The square-like shape of the nebula gives it the nickname “Box Nebula”.

The central star of the planetary nebula is an O-type star with a spectral type of O(He).

See also 
 List of NGC objects (6001–7000)

References

External links 
 

Ophiuchus (constellation)
6309
Planetary nebulae